The Boston mayoral election of 1878 saw  Frederick O. Prince elected to return the mayoralty for a second nonconsecutive term.

Results

See also
List of mayors of Boston, Massachusetts

References

Mayoral elections in Boston
Boston
Boston mayoral
19th century in Boston